Bloody Tourists is the sixth studio album by the English rock band 10cc, released worldwide by Mercury Records and in North America by Polydor Records in September 1978. Recorded at Strawberry Studios South in Dorking, the album was produced by Eric Stewart and Graham Gouldman.

Overview
The album is the first 10cc studio album to feature the band as a six piece. The new lineup was already assembled for the tour in support of the band's previous album, Deceptive Bends, but changing Tony O'Malley for Duncan Mackay on the keyboards. The band was also solidified with songwriting and lead vocals contributions from other members than the core duo of Stewart and Gouldman, however it was also the first 10cc album to feature songs written separately by Stewart and Gouldman.

Cover art
The cover art was again created by Hipgnosis with graphics by George Hardie and shows a map being blown into someone's face. The map is showing the French island Martinique, located in the Lesser Antilles of the West Indies in the eastern Caribbean Sea. The cover photograph was taken by Aubrey Powell of Hipgnosis. The cover idea had been first presented to Genesis, who rejected it. The cover was also the first to feature the longtime 10cc logo with a star inside the zero.

Release and reception
The first single "Dreadlock Holiday" b/w non album track "Nothing Can Move Me" preceded the album and topped the charts in several countries, including the United Kingdom, where it became the band's third and last number-one hit. Driven by the success of the lead single, the album reached number 3 in the UK Albums Chart.

The second single varied in different territories. While most of the countries received "Reds in My Bed", "For You and I" was issued in America where it was also featured on the soundtrack for the film Moment by Moment, while "From Rochdale to Ocho Rios" was released in Oceania. The b-side was "Take These Chains" for all territories.

Record World said the single "For You and I" "is a typically lush production with picturesque lyrics and a pop perfect hook."

The album was reissued on CD in 1997 adding "Nothing Can Move Me", the b-side to "Dreadlock Holiday", as bonus track. In 2008 the Japanese reissue added additional versions of the album songs as bonus tracks.

Track listing

Personnel

10cc
Eric Stewart – lead vocals (tracks 2-4, 6, 9-10, 12), backing vocals, lead guitar, electric guitar, slide guitar, electric piano, grand piano, synthesizer, organ, acoustic guitar, percussion
Graham Gouldman – lead vocals (tracks 1, 5, 8, 11), backing vocals, bass guitar, electric guitar, acoustic guitar, zither, wind chimes, percussion
Rick Fenn – backing vocals, electric guitar, lead guitar, acoustic guitar, fretless bass, saxophone, synthesizer, organ, percussion
Paul Burgess – drums, percussion, backing vocals
Stuart Tosh – lead vocal (track 7), backing vocals, drums, percussion, trombone
Duncan Mackay – backing vocals, grand piano, electric piano, synthesizer, violin, percussion

Additional personnel
 Kate Spath – cello on "Old Mister Time"
 Tony Spath – backing vocal on "From Rochdale to Ocho Rios"

Technical personnel
Keith Bessey – engineer
Tony Spath – engineer
Melvyn Abrahams – mastering
Hipgnosis – cover design and photos
George Hardie – graphics

Charts

Weekly charts

Year-end charts

Certifications and sales

References

External links
10ccworld

10cc albums
1978 albums
Albums produced by Eric Stewart
Albums produced by Graham Gouldman
Progressive rock albums by English artists
Art rock albums by English artists
Mercury Records albums
Polydor Records albums
Albums recorded at Strawberry Studios
Albums with cover art by Hipgnosis